Relations. Beyond Anthropocentrism is an open access peer-reviewed journal focusing on ethics and related topics from a non-anthropocentric perspective. The journal aims to create an interdisciplinary forum within Europe to promote discussion of scientific and moral problems that relate to the need to transcend the anthropocentric nature of existing structures of knowledge. The journal's language is English, but it is published in Italy. The content includes commentary, debates, interviews and reports on conferences, activities, workshops, events and other projects. Submissions are intended to be understood by both an academic and lay audience. Relations. was published biannually from 2013 to 2018, then annually in 2019 and 2020. It is edited by Francesco Allegri, Matteo Andreozzi, Sofia Bonicalzi and Eleonora Adorni. Topics of past issues include animal emotions, animal personhood, antispeciesism, wild animal suffering, posthumanism, animal products and energy ethics.

In a 2018 review, Animal Ethics identified Relations. Beyond Anthropocentrism as one of several journals in philosophy and ethics focussed on "animal issues". They also named the long-standing journal Between the Species, the defunct Ethics & Animals, the Journal of Animal Ethics, and Politics & Animals, as well as the Journal of Agricultural and Environmental Ethics (which is not solely focussed on animals) and the Journal of Applied Animal Ethics Research (which had not begun publishing at the time of the article).

See also 
 Etica & Animali

References

External links 
 

Animal ethics journals
Annual journals
Biannual journals
English-language journals
Environmental ethics journals
Publications established in 2013